The Thomas salto is an extremely difficult and dangerous move performed during the floor exercise in artistic gymnastics. It is named after American gymnast Kurt Thomas.

Technical details
The Thomas salto consists of a 1 ½ salto backward in a tucked or piked position with 1 ½ twists or a 1 ½ salto backward in a layout (straight) position with 1 ½ twists.

The move is effectively banned as it was removed from the Code of Points following several serious accidents, most notably the paralysis of Elena Mukhina in 1980. As of the 2017–2020 "3/2 salto elements with reception by and then spring from the hands are not permitted", effectively banning the Thomas salto for all gymnasts.

References

Gymnastics elements

External links
Code of Points for Men
Code of Points for Women